Chester Catawba Regional Airport  is a county-owned public-use airport located five nautical miles (9 km) north of the central business district of Chester, a city in Chester County, South Carolina, United States. It is technically a "regional" airport, but does not have a scheduled air service; it is mainly for the use of private aircraft for residents of Chester County. According to the FAA's National Plan of Integrated Airport Systems for 2009–2013, it is categorized as a general aviation facility.

Although many U.S. airports use the same three-letter location identifier for the FAA and IATA, this facility is assigned DCM by the FAA but has no designation from the IATA (which assigned DCM to Mazamet Airport in Castres, France).

Facilities and aircraft 
It has two asphalt paved runways: 5/23 is 4,998 by 100 feet (1,523 x 30 m) and 17/35 is 5,000 by 100 feet (1,524 x 30 m).

For the 12-month period ending August 27, 2009, the airport had 8,400 general aviation aircraft operations, an average of 23 per day. At that time there were 31 aircraft based at this airport: 97% single-engine and 3% multi-engine.

References

External links 
 Airport data for DCM from SC Aeronautics Commission
 Aerial image as of 21 January 1994 from USGS The National Map
 

Airports in South Carolina
Buildings and structures in Chester County, South Carolina
Transportation in Chester County, South Carolina